Ratta is a village in the Kallar Kahar Tehsil District Chakwal Punjab province of Pakistan. It is located at 32°51'0N 72°41'0E with an altitude of 520 metres (1709 feet). Now called by People Ratta Sharif

References

Villages in Punjab, Pakistan
Villages in Kallar Kahar Tehsil
Populated places in Chakwal District